The following is a list of films produced, co-produced, and/or distributed by Warner Bros. in 2000–2009. This list does not include direct-to-video releases or films from New Line Cinema prior to its merger with Warner Bros. in 2008, nor does it include third-party films or films WB gained the rights to as a result of mergers or acquisitions.

See also 
 List of New Line Cinema films
 List of films based on DC Comics
 List of Warner Bros. theatrical animated feature films
 :Category:Lists of films by studio

References 

Lists of Warner Bros. films
Warner Bros. films
Warner Bros